Tatyanovka is a rural locality (a village) in Itkulovsky Selsoviet, Ishimbaysky District, Bashkortostan, Russia. The population was 15 as of 2010. There are 3 streets.

Geography 
Tatyanovka is located 27 km southeast of Ishimbay (the district's administrative centre) by road. Osipovka is the nearest rural locality.

References 

Rural localities in Ishimbaysky District
Ufa Governorate